Fort Provintia or Providentia, also known as Chihkan Tower, was a Dutch outpost on Formosa at a site now located in West Central District, Tainan, Taiwan. It was built in 1653 during the Dutch colonization of Taiwan. The Dutch, intending to strengthen their standing, sited the fort at Sakam, about  due east from modern-day Anping. During the Siege of Fort Zeelandia (1662), the fort was surrendered to Koxinga, but was later destroyed by a rebellion and earthquakes in the 18th century. It was rebuilt afterwards in the 19th century under Qing rule.

The fort's name derives from the Taiwanese aboriginal village recorded by the Dutch as Sakam, which has developed into the modern-day Tainan. After growth in size and trade, the Chinese called it Chhiah-kham, and surrounded it with high brick walls. It eventually became the capital of the whole island under the name of Taiwan-fu.

In addition to the site's architectural and artistic significance, its library of dictionaries and business transactions documents the Siraya language spoken by the native inhabitants of the region during Dutch rule.

The fort is up for redevelopment which will see it turned into a museum. The project is led by Taiwanese architecture studio HOU x LIN, the two partners of which both have a connection to The Netherlands. The project should be finished by 2024 in time for the celebration of the 400 year old relationship of the two countries.

See also

 Fort San Domingo
 Ft. Zeelandia
 Cape of San Diego
 Eternal Golden Castle
 History of Taiwan
 Taiwan under Dutch rule
 Koxinga
 Siraya

Footnotes

References

Bibliography

1653 establishments in Dutch Formosa
Provintia
Dutch Formosa
Former properties of the Dutch East India Company
Buildings and structures associated with the Dutch East India Company
National monuments of Taiwan